The following is a list of dishes found in Burmese cuisine. Burmese cuisine includes dishes from various regions of Burma (now officially known as Myanmar). The diversity of Myanmar's cuisine has also been contributed to by the myriad of local ethnic minorities. The Bamars are the most dominant group, but other groups including the Chin people also have distinct cuisines. Burmese cuisine is characterized by extensive use of fish products like fish sauce and ngapi (fermented seafood). Owing to the geographic location of Myanmar, Burmese cuisine has been influenced by Chinese cuisine, Indian cuisine and Thai cuisine.

Burmese salads

Bamar-influenced

Chinese-inspired

Indian-inspired

Kachin-inspired

Rakhine-inspired

Shan-inspired

Mon-inspired

Karen inspired

Hin

Desserts

See also
	 
 Burmese cuisine
 List of ingredients in Burmese cuisine

References

Burmese Dishes
Dishes